Amir al-Mu'minin is an Arabic title designating the supreme leader of an Islamic community. It is usually translated as "Commander of the Faithful", though sometimes also as "Prince of the Believers", a translation deriving from the fact that the word  is used as a princely title in states ruled by the royalty or monarchies. However, according to orientalist historian H. A. R. Gibb, this translation is "neither philologically nor historically correct".

Historical usage
The title derives from the common Arabic term designating a military commander, and was used for Muslim military commanders already during the lifetime of Muhammad. In this capacity it was, for example, borne by the Muslim commander at the Battle of al-Qadisiyya. On his accession in 634, Umar ibn Khattab, the Second Rashidun Caliph, was given the title. According to At-Tabaqat al Kubra, When Abu Bakr died, Muslims of the time said: “We are the Mu'minin (Believers/Faithful) and Umar is our Amir (Commander).” After this, the title Amir al-Mu'minin was held by Umar ibn Khattab who was also the first one to be given this title. This was likely not for its military connotation, but rather deriving from a Quranic injunction to "Obey God and obey the Apostle and those invested with command among you" (Sura 4, verses 58–62). From Umar on, the title became a fixed part of caliphal titulature; Indeed, it appears to have been the chief title of the early caliphs, and the actual title of caliph does not appear to have been adopted until the reign of the Umayyad caliph Abd al-Malik ibn Marwan, when he adopted it as a means to strengthen his position, whose legitimacy had been shaky following the Second Fitna.

Among Sunnis, the adoption of the title of  became virtually tantamount to claiming the caliphate. As a result, the title was used by the great Islamic dynasties that claimed the universal leadership over the Muslim community: the Umayyads, Abbasids, and Fatimids. In later centuries, it was also adopted by regional rulers, especially in the western parts of the Muslim world, who used the caliphal rank to emphasize their independent authority and legitimacy, rather than any ecumenical claim. The Umayyads of Cordoba adopted it in 928, whence it was also used by several other minor rulers of al-Andalus. From 1253, the Hafsids of Ifriqiya claimed the caliphate, and were followed by the Marinids of Morocco, following whom all successive Moroccan dynasties—the last two of them, the Saadi dynasty and the current Alaouite dynasty, also by virtue of their claimed descent from Muhammad—have also claimed it. The Constitution of Morocco still uses the term  as the principal title of the King of Morocco, as a means to "[legitimise the monarchy's] hegemonic role and its position outside significant constitutional restraint".

It was used in this sense by the early Ottoman sultans—who notably rarely used the caliphal title after they took it from the Abbasids in 1517—as well as various West African Muslim warlords until the modern period. The title was used by Aurangzeb, the sixth emperor of the Mughal Empire. Muhammad Umar Khan of the Kokand Khanate took on the title.

Abdelkader El Djezairi assumed the title in 1834. The Afghan ruler Dost Mohammad Khan likewise used it when he proclaimed a  against the Sikh in 1836. According to historian Richard Pennell, this pattern reflects the use of the term  for regional rulers with the connotations of wide-ranging and absolute authority over a region, the power to conduct relations with foreign states, the upkeep of the Sharia, and the protection of Muslim territory from non-believers. Timur (Tamerlane) also used the title.

Modern usage
In 1996, the title was adopted by the Taliban leader Mohammed Omar. Mullah Mohammed Omar was conferred the title in April 1996 by a Taliban-convened shura (assembly) of approximately 1000-1500 Afghan ulama in Kandahar, when he displayed the Cloak of the Prophet before the crowd. The title granted legitimacy to Omar's leadership of Afghanistan and his declared jihad against the government led by Burhanuddin Rabbani. Omar was still referred to as Amir al-Mu'minin by his followers and other jihadists, notably al-Qaeda leader Ayman az-Zawahiri. Mullah Akhtar Mohammad Mansoor, the successor of Mullah Omar, was conferred the title in July 2015 upon his appointment as the new leader of the Taliban. Hibatullah Akhundzada, the third Supreme Leader of the Taliban, was also conferred the title upon his election in 2016 and became the Leader of Afghanistan in 2021. The King of Morocco is styled Amir al-Mu'minin according to the Moroccan constitution. In 2005, the Islamic State leader Abu Umar al-Baghdadi adopted the title, nine years before the Islamic State proclaimed its caliphate in 2014. Abu Umar al-Baghdadi was conferred the title after his appointment in October 2006 by the Mujahideen Shura Council as the first Emir of the newly declared Islamic State of Iraq. As Richard Pennell commented, by claiming the title they positioned themselves as potential "caliphs-in-waiting", but for the moment, the title was simply the expression of their claim to an overarching "activist authority" over the areas they controlled.

Shi'a views

Twelver
Twelver Shi'ite Muslims apply the title exclusively to Imam Ali ibn Abu Talib, the cousin and son-in-law of Muhammad, regarded as the first Imam by the Shi'a and the officially designated successor to Muhammad. The Shi'a hold that he was the only one given the title during Muhammad's lifetime.

Ismailism
In Nasir al-Din al-Tusi's The Voyage (Sayr wa-Suluk), he explains that the hearts of the believers are attached to the Commander of the Believers, not just the Command (written word) itself. There is always a present living imam in the world, and following him, a believer could never go astray.

Zaydism
The title was thus part of the titulature of the Zaydi Imams of Yemen until the end of the Yemeni monarchy. The Kharijites did not use the term, except for the Rustamid dynasty.

Non-Muslim usage
The Kitáb-i-Íqán, the primary theological work of the Baháʼí Faith, applies the title Commander of the Faithful to Ali, the son-in-law of the Islamic prophet Muhammad.

A similar (but not the same) title was afforded to the Polish–Lithuanian Commonwealth's monarch as the Grand Duke of Lithuania by the Lipka Tatars, who used to speak a Turkic language. The title of sire was used "Vatad", as in "homeland" ("Vatan"), which meant "defender of the rights of Muslims in non-Islamic countries." The Grand Duchy was viewed as a new homeland. Vatad was viewed as a variation on the name Vytautas in Lithuanian or Władysław in Polish, which was known in the diplomatic notes between the Golden Horde and the countries of Poland (Lechistan) and Lithuania (Lipka) as "Dawood". One can claim that, since Casimir the Great, the Polish-Lithuanian monarch as the King of Poland was tasked with the protection of the rights of the Jews and other non-Christians.

In fiction
In James Joyce's 1939 novel Finnegans Wake (page 34.6), an informer who is spreading nasty rumours about the main character is described as "Ibid, commender of the frightful".

In the French comic series Iznogoud, Caliph Haroun El Poussah, one of the protagonists of the series, is frequently addressed by inferiors as commander of the faithful (commandeur des croyants in the original French).

In Margaret Atwood's 1985 dystopian novel The Handmaid's Tale leaders of the fictional Republic of Gilead, a militaristic theonomy, are referred to as "Commanders of the Faithful."

See also

 Almami
 Caliph
 Sunni view of the Sahaba
 Compare 
 Defender of the Faith
 Holy Roman Emperor
 Shura

References

Sources
 
 
 

Caliphs
Arabic words and phrases in Sharia
Islamic honorifics
Religious leadership roles
Ottoman titles